Holcolaetis is a genus of the spider family Salticidae (jumping spiders).

Like Euryattus and Thiania bhamoensis, these spiders build a flat, densely woven egg sac that is not contiguous with the silk of the nest. Holcolaetis posits the egg sac on the trunks of trees.

Species
 Holcolaetis albobarbata Simon, 1910 – West, Central Africa
 Holcolaetis clarki Wanless, 1985 – West, Central Africa
 Holcolaetis cothurnata (Gerstäcker, 1873) – Zanzibar
 Holcolaetis strandi Caporiacco, 1940 – Ethiopia
 Holcolaetis vellerea Simon, 1909 – West, Central Africa, Yemen
 Holcolaetis xerampelina Simon, 1886 – Central Africa
 Holcolaetis zuluensis Lawrence, 1937 – Southern Africa

References
  (2002): Rivet-like nest-building and agonistic behaviour of Thiania bhamoensis, an iridescent jumping spider (Araneae: Salticidae) from Singapore. 50(1): 143-151. PDF
  (2007): The world spider catalog, version 8.0. American Museum of Natural History.

Notes

External links
 Photograph of Holcolaetis sp.
 Photograph of H. vellerea

Spiders of Africa
Spiders of Asia
Salticidae
Salticidae genera
Taxa named by Eugène Simon